Sar Molla or Sar Mala may refer to:
 Sar Mala, Fars
 Sar Molla, Hormozgan